The Anglican Diocese of London forms part of the Province of Canterbury in England. Historically the diocese covered a large area north of the River Thames, and bordered the dioceses of Norwich and Lincoln to the north and west. The present diocese covers 177 square miles (458 km2), and 17 London boroughs, covering most of Greater London north of the Thames and west of the River Lea. This area covers nearly all of the historic county of Middlesex, and includes the City of London in which lies its cathedral, St Paul's, as well as encompassing Spelthorne, formerly in Middlesex but now in Surrey. Essex formed part of the diocese until 1846 when it became part of the Diocese of Chelmsford. The diocese is divided into five episcopal areas, each of which (except the central one) is the particular responsibility of one of the diocese's suffragan bishops. It is further divided into archdeaconries and rural deaneries, as shown below.

Archdeaconries and deaneries 

*including the Cathedral and Temple

**including the Abbey and its Church

Archdeaconry of London

Not in a deanery

Deanery of the City of London

Deanery of Westminster Paddington

Deanery of Westminster St Margaret

Deanery of Westminster St Marylebone

Archdeaconry of Hampstead

Deanery of Central Barnet

Deanery of West Barnet

Deanery of North Camden (Hampstead)

Deanery of South Camden (St Pancras and Holborn)

Deanery of Enfield

Deanery of East Haringey

Deanery of West Haringey

Archdeaconry of Middlesex

Deanery of Hammersmith and Fulham

Deanery of Hampton

1in some sources this church is listed in Hounslow Deanery

Deanery of Hounslow

Deanery of Kensington

Deanery of Chelsea

Deanery of Spelthorne

Archdeaconry of Hackney

Deanery of Hackney

Deanery of Islington

Deanery of Tower Hamlets

Archdeaconry of Northolt

Deanery of Brent

Deanery of Ealing

Deanery of Harrow

Deanery of Hillingdon

References

External links
Diocesan website

 
Diocese of London